Go! Sports Ski (Feel Ski in Europe) is a sports video game developed by Yuke's and published by Sony Computer Entertainment exclusively for PlayStation 3.

Gameplay 
For the controls, the game only makes use of the Sixaxis motion sensors. The player can choose between 3 practice modes and a split-screen battle offline, and 2 singleplayer leaderboards time trials and a 4 players battle mode online. These modes can be played on 2 different tracks. The game also has an achievement system in which the player can earn a maximum of 27 emblems that can be displayed in the online records.

On November 19 2021, Sony Interactive Entertainment Japan announced that the online service for Go! Sports Ski would be terminated on December 24 2021.  Offline modes will continue to be accessible.

Reception

Go! Sports Ski received negative reviews from critics. Austin Shau of GameSpot, giving the game a 4/10, criticized the game for its "unreliable" Sixaxis controls and the lack of AI opponents to race against in the single-player mode. Chris Roper of IGN gave the game a 2.1/10 while also criticizing its control scheme, physics model and the emblems' unlock requirements.

References

External links 
Go! Sports Ski on the PlayStation Store (Wayback Machine copy)

2007 video games
Multiplayer and single-player video games
PlayStation 3 games
PlayStation 3-only games
PlayStation Network games
Sony Interactive Entertainment games
Skiing video games
Video games developed in Japan
Yuke's games